Požega, formerly Užička Požega, is a town and municipality located in the Zlatibor District of western Serbia. The population of the town is 13,153, while the municipality has 29,638 inhabitants.

Settlements
Aside from the town of Požega, the municipality includes the following settlements: 

 Bakionica
 Velika Ježevica
 Visibaba
 Vranjani
 Glumač
 Godovik
 Gornja Dobrinja
 Gorobilje
 Gugalj
 Donja Dobrinja
 Dražinovići
 Duškovci
 Zaselje
 Zdravčići
 Jelen Do
 Kalenići
 Lopaš
 Loret
 Ljutice
 Mađer
 Mala Ježevica
 Milićevo Selo
 Mršelji
 Otanj
 Papratište
 Pilatovići
 Prijanovići
 Prilipac
 Radovci
 Rasna
 Rečice
 Roge
 Rupeljevo
 Svračkovo
 Srednja Dobrinja
 Tabanovići
 Tvrdići
 Tometino Polje
 Tučkovo
 Uzići
 Čestobrodica

Demographics

According to the 2011 census results, the municipality of Požega has a population of 29,638 inhabitants.

Ethnic groups
The ethnic composition of the town:

Economy
The following table gives a preview of total number of registered people employed in legal entities per their core activity (as of 2018):

Transportation

Požega is one of the main road and railway transportation centers in Western Serbia. It is located on the crossroads of the most important state roads in Western Serbia – State Road 21 and State Road 23. Also, a section of A2 motorway which is under construction passes through Požega. Also, it is a transportation hub between Kraljevo-Čačak-Užice railway and Belgrade–Bar railway.

Climate
Požega has a humid continental climate (Köppen climate classification: Dfb) with warm summers, and cold, snowy winters. With 124 days of fog a year, and only 1594 hours of sunshine, it is amongst the foggiest and least sunny towns in Serbia.

Media
Požega has several media with a local coverage:
 TV Stations: TV Požega
 Radio Stations: Radio Požega

Gallery

Notable people
 Miloš Obrenović I (1780–1860), first monarch of modern Serbia
 Dragiša Lapčević (1867–1939), politician
 Petar Leković (1893 — 1942), the first person to be awarded with Order of the People's Hero title
 Milovan Destil Marković (1957), artist
 Srđan Mijailović (1993), football player
 Milica Nikolić (1993), politician

References

External links

 

 
Municipalities and cities of Šumadija and Western Serbia